RuPaul's Drag Race Holi-slay Spectacular was a holiday television special, which aired on VH1 on December 7, 2018. The hour-long RuPaul's Drag Race special, announced on November 1, had former Drag Race contestants Eureka O'Hara, Jasmine Masters, Kim Chi, Latrice Royale, Mayhem Miller, Shangela, Sonique, and Trixie Mattel compete to become "Drag Race Christmas Queen".

The contestants had to lip-sync to holiday music by RuPaul, including tracks from Slay Belles (2015) and Christmas Party (2018), to choreography by Todrick Hall.

Jasmine Masters and Latrice Royale later competed in fourth season of RuPaul's Drag Race All Stars, which was previewed during the programme's airing and premiered one-week after the Holi-slay Spectacular and placing 10th and 5th, respectively.

Mayhem Miller later competed in fifth season of RuPaul's Drag Race All Stars, placing 7th.

Eureka O'Hara and Sonique later competed in sixth season of RuPaul's Drag Race All Stars, placing 2nd-4th and 1st, respectively.

Contestants 
(Ages and names stated are at time of contest.)

Challenges

For the mini challenge, the queens were paired with a member of the pit crew to dance down the runway ("Christmas Cookies"). Mayhem Miller won the mini challenge. The contestants get ready for the main challenge ("My Favorite Holiday").

RuPaul performs "Hey Sis, It's Christmas" on the runway alongside the dancers. For the main challenge, the queens must lip sync to RuPaul's song "Get to You" in a 1980s-inspired costume to choreography by Todrick Hall. The runway theme is "Non-denominational Christmas Eleganza Extravaganza".

All the queens lip synched in pairs against one another: Mayhem Miller vs. Sonique ("Merry Christmas, Mary"); Jasmine Masters vs. Shangela ("Jingle Dem Bells"); Eureka vs. Trixie Mattel ("Deck the Halls"); Kim Chi vs. Latrice Royale ("Brand New Year"). RuPaul declared that they are all winners. At the end of the episode, Michelle Visage and RuPaul lip synced for their lives ("Christmas Party"); the judging panel, consisting of the queens along with Ross Matthews and Todrick Hall, declares a double save.

Lip syncs

Reception
The program received mixed reviews as many expected a typical episode, when it was actually a promo tool for RuPaul's new Christmas album, Christmas Party. Variety said "the special quickly pulls a bait and switch, becoming both much sneakier and way less interesting than its festive first impression", calling out RuPaul's promo plug for the album. The A.V. Club gave it a C+ and stated that, despite the flaws, the episode was not without its charm, but still criticised the promotional aspect for RuPaul's Christmas album. Bustle praised the program, saying "it took a turn for the delightfully cheesy, as most holiday specials are wont to do. Its aim quickly became not to pit queens against one another, but of course, to spread Christmas cheer, all while donning their gay apparel in its most literal form", noting it was a welcomed departure from the show's origins. TV Line also praised it and highlighted the looks of Eureka, Mayhem, Trixie and Shangela. In an interview with Entertainment Weekly, Sonique also praised her fellow contestant, Mayhem. USA Today concluded by saying "So if you want to see some spectacular holiday looks from your favorite queens mixed with some fun and festive beats, you  don't want to Christ-miss this! Just don't expect to be on the edge of your seat."

Ratings

References

2018 television specials
Christmas television specials
RuPaul's Drag Race
VH1